The Texas State Bobcats baseball program is the intercollegiate baseball team representing Texas State University. The Bobcats' first season was in 1985, and have played their home games at Bobcat Ballpark on the university's campus in San Marcos, Texas since 2009.

Since the 2014 season, the Bobcats have competed as a member of the Sun Belt Conference. Previously, the Bobcats were a member of the Western Athletic Conference (WAC), Southland Conference, and Gulf Star Conference.

History
Ty Harrington (University of Texas at Austin '89) began his tenure as Texas State baseball's fourth head coach in the 2000 season and compiled an overall record of 657-516-2 over 20 seasons. His overall record includes a 265-146 record in the Southland Conference and a 95-85 record in the Sun Belt Conference. Harrington was honored as the Southland Conference Coach of the Year in 2009 and 2011. Texas State won three consecutive regular season SLC championships in 2009, 2010 and 2011 under Harrington. His teams also won the SLC tournament championship in 2000 and 2011 and made three NCAA Championship Regional appearances in 2000, 2009 and 2011. Harrington guided Texas State to its first Sun Belt Conference regular season championship in 2019. He has helped produce 88 all-conference selections, 10 All-Americans, seven conference players of the year and 53 Major League Baseball Draftees. On June 20, 2019, Harrington retired after 20 seasons at Texas State.

On July 1, 2019, Steven Trout was named Texas State baseball's fifth head coach. Trout previously served as Texas State's associate head coach for the 2018 and 2019 seasons and as an assistant coach in 2016 and 2017. Prior to his current stint with the Bobcats, Trout was an assistant coach on the West Virginia Mountaineers staff from 2013 to 2015.

Bobcat Ballpark

Texas State hosted the Texas Longhorns in Bobcat Ballpark's first game on March 3, 2009 in front of a then-record 2,593 spectators.  As of the end of the 2019 season, the Bobcats have a 225-116-1 record at the facility.

Year-by-year results

References:

Notable players
Will Brunson
Tommy Field
Jeremy Fikac
Paul Goldschmidt
Billy Grabarkewitz
Billy Jones
Scott Linebrink
Carson Smith
Joe Vance
Blake Williams

See also
List of NCAA Division I baseball programs

References

External links